Nanaco (trademarked as nanaco) is a prepaid cash-rechargeable contactless electronic money card used at Seven & I Holdings-owned stores in Japan, which are 7-Eleven convenience stores, Denny's restaurants, and Ito-Yokado merchandise stores. In addition, Nanaco can be used at more than 7,000 stores outside the company's group, especially those that are JCM affiliated shops. 

Supplied by IY Card Service Co., Ltd. (later renamed Seven Card Service Co., Ltd.), a subsidiary of Seven & I Holdings Co., Ltd., Nanaco is available as Nanaco card (plastic card) and Nanaco mobile (Osaifu-Keitai application for mobile phones with embedded contactless chip).
The Nanaco format also features a postpay function (on the QUICPay scheme), which was made available to IY Card (since renamed "Seven Card") credit card holders since the summer of 2007.  Purchases with Nanaco earn points, which can later be used to make more purchases. The cards uses Sony's FeliCa technology, which is also used in a wide variety of contactless smart cards including Suica, Edy, and Pasmo. Services began on April 23, 2007 and the number of members is more than 3.8 million as of end-June 2007.

"Nana" means "seven" in Japanese, and the giraffe's head and neck is in the shape of the number "7," in reference to "7-Eleven" and "Seven & i Holdings."

As of March 2016, 45 million nanaco cards have been issued, and 215,300 stores accept nanaco payment.

History
 April 23, 2007 - pilot program launched at 1,500 7-Eleven stores in Tokyo
 May 2007 - service is expanded nationwide at all 7-Eleven stores
 September 3, 2007 - Nanaco card charging service begins at Seven Bank ATMs
 October 10, 2007 - 5 million cards distributed
 February 2008 - Nanaco cards accepted at all Denny's restaurants
 March 25, 2008 - Nanaco cards accepted at Ito-Yokado stores
 June 1, 2008 - Credit card charging service starts for IY Card branded credit cards (later renamed as Seven Card)
 March 30, 2010 - Nanaco cards accepted at Coca-Cola multi-money vending machines
 March 31, 2010 - 10 million cards distributed
 April 18, 2014 - The number of monthly transaction exceeded 100 million 

The "Nanaco card" issued by Seven-Eleven Japan became the most frequently used e-wallet within three months after it was introduced in April 2007.

References

External links 
 

7-Eleven
Contactless smart cards
Japanese brands